Ballylahan Castle is a tower house and National Monument located in County Mayo, Ireland.

Location

History
This castle was constructed in 1239 by Jordan de Exeter, Sheriff of Connacht and was the ancient seat of the Mac Siúrtáin (MacJordans).

The castle came under attack in 1316 by the King of Connacht, Fedlim Ó Conchobair and was almost destroyed.

Building
The main entrance was in the east and it was flanked by two circular towers, of which only one remains. The entrance gives access to an irregular hexagonal bawn. There is evidence of buildings particularly against the western wall. The bawn has some good base-batter, particularly at the northwest corner.

References

National Monuments in County Mayo
Castles in County Mayo